Noah Hallett (born September 9, 1997) is a Canadian football defensive back for the Winnipeg Blue Bombers of the Canadian Football League (CFL). He was drafted by the Blue Bombers in the second round of the 2020 CFL Draft.

Professional career 
Hallett was drafted in the second round (18th overall) of the 2020 CFL Draft.

Personal life 
Hallett's brother Nick was drafted by the Blue Bombers in the seventh round of the 2019 CFL Draft.

References

External links 
 Winnipeg Blue Bombers profile
 McMaster Marauders profile

1997 births
Living people
Sportspeople from London, Ontario
Players of Canadian football from Ontario
Canadian football defensive backs
McMaster Marauders football players
Winnipeg Blue Bombers players